Sir Henry Flemming Hibbert, 1st Baronet  (4 April 1850 – 15 November 1927) was a British Conservative politician.

Hibbert was chairman of the Technical Instruction Committee of the Lancashire County Council. He received the freedom and livery of the Plumbers′ Company in December 1902, and was awarded a knighthood in 1903.

He was elected the Member of Parliament for Chorley following the 1913 by-election and served until 1918. He became deputy lieutenant of the County of Lancaster in 1915. In 1919 he was created a baronet, of Chorley in the County of Lancashire, which became extinct on his death.

He died in 1927, aged 77, and was buried in Chorley cemetery.

Family
Hibbert had married Marion Theresa Reuss (5 March 1851 – 13 September 1942). Their son, Cyril, was killed in action during World War I.

References

External links 
 
 

1850 births
1927 deaths
Conservative Party (UK) MPs for English constituencies
UK MPs 1910–1918
Knights Bachelor
Baronets in the Baronetage of the United Kingdom
Deputy Lieutenants